Heydarabad or Heidar Abad or Haiderabad may refer to:

Azerbaijan
Heydarabad, Azerbaijan, a village and municipality in the Sadarak Rayon of Nakhchivan Autonomous Republic, Azerbaijan
Heydərabad, a town and municipality in the Saatly Rayon of Azerbaijan

Bangladesh
Haidarabad, Bangladesh, a village in Comilla District

India
Hyderabad, a city
 Hyderabad State, a former princely state

Iran

Ardabil Province
Heydarabad, Ardabil, a village in Meshgin Shahr County

Chaharmahal and Bakhtiari Province
Heydarabad, Chaharmahal and Bakhtiari, a village in Kuhrang County
Heydarabad-e Meyheh, a village in Kuhrang County

East Azerbaijan Province
Heydarabad, Charuymaq, a village in Charuymaq County
Heydarabad, Sarab, a village in Sarab County
Heydarabad, Sufian, a village in Shabestar County
Heydarabad, Tasuj, a village in Shabestar County

Fars Province
Heydarabad, Fasa, a village in Fasa County
Heydarabad, Gerash, a village in Gerash County
Heydarabad, Jahrom, a village in Jahrom County
Heydarabad, Mamasani, a village in Mamasani County
Heydarabad, Neyriz, a village in Neyriz County
Heydarabad, Shiraz, a village in Shiraz County
Heydarabad, Zarrin Dasht, a village in Zarrin Dasht County

Golestan Province
Heydarabad, Aqqala, a village in Aqqala County
Heydarabad, Gorgan, a village in Gorgan County
Heydarabad-e Mohammad Shir, a village in Kalaleh County

Hamadan Province
Heydarabad, Hamadan, a village in Asadabad County

Hormozgan Province
Heydarabad, Hormozgan, a village in Bashagard County

Ilam Province
Heydarabad, Darreh Shahr, a village in Darreh Shahr County
Heydarabad, Ilam, a village in Ilam County

Isfahan Province
Heydarabad, Barzavand, a village in Ardestan County
Heydarabad, Garmsir, a village in Ardestan County
Heydarabad, Chadegan, a village in Chadegan County
Heydarabad, Isfahan, a village in Isfahan County
Heydarabad, Jarqavieh Sofla, a village in Isfahan County
Heydarabad, Kuhpayeh, a village in Isfahan County
Heydarabad, Semirom, a village in Semirom County
Heydarabad-e Ali Mardani, a village in Semirom County
Heydarabad-e Qur Tapasi, a village in Semirom County

Kerman Province
Heydarabad, Anbarabad, a village Anbarabad County
Heydarabad, Arzuiyeh, a village in Arzuiyeh County
Heydarabad, Soghan, a village in Arzuiyeh County
Heydarabad, Bardsir, a village in Bardsir County
Heydarabad, Fahraj, a village in Fahraj County
Heydarabad, Faryab, a village in Faryab County
Heydarabad, Rigan, a village in Rigan County
Heydarabad, Rudbar-e Jonubi, a village in Rudbar-e Jonubi County
Heydarabad, Jazmurian, a village in Rudbar-e Jonubi County
Heydarabad, Shahr-e Babak, a village in Shahr-e Babak County
Heydarabad-e Sohrab, a village in Shahr-e Babak County

Kermanshah Province
Heydarabad, Harsin, a village in Harsin County
Heydarabad, Sonqor, a village in Sonqor County

Khuzestan Province
Heydarabad, Andika, a village in Andika County
Heydarabad, Lali, a village in Lali County

Kohgiluyeh and Boyer-Ahmad Province
Heydarabad-e Olya, a village in Boyer-Ahmad County
Heydarabad-e Sofla, a village in Boyer-Ahmad County
Heydarabad-e Tang Seh Riz, a village in Boyer-Ahmad County
Heydarabad, Kohgiluyeh and Boyer-Ahmad, a village in Kohgiluyeh County

Kurdistan Province
Heydarabad, Kurdistan, a village in Divandarreh County

Lorestan Province
Heydarabad, Delfan, a village in Delfan County
Heydarabad, Kakavand, a village Delfan County
Heydarabad-e Marali, a village in Delfan County
Heydarabad, Dorud, a village in Dorud County
Heydarabad, Khorramabad, a village in Khorramabad County
Heydarabad, Honam, a village in Selseleh County
Heydarabad-e Chenareh, a village in Selseleh County
Heydarabad-e Saki, a village in Selseleh County

Markazi Province
Heydarabad, Markazi, a village in Khomeyn County

Mazandaran Province
Heydarabad, Abbasabad, a village in Abbasabad County
Heydarabad, Juybar, a village in Juybar County

North Khorasan Province
Heydarabad, North Khorasan, a village in North Khorasan Province, Iran

Qazvin Province
Heydarabad, Qazvin, a village in Qazvin Province, Iran

Qom Province
Heydarabad, Qom, a village in Qom Province, Iran

Razavi Khorasan Province
Heydarabad, Fariman, a village in Fariman County
Heydarabad, Firuzeh, a village in Firuzeh County
Heydarabad, Nishapur, a village in Nishapur County

Semnan Province
Heydarabad, Semnan, a village in Damghan County

Sistan and Baluchestan Province
Heydarabad, Bampur, a village in Bampur County
Heydarabad, Poshtkuh, a village in Khash County
Heydarabad, alternate name of Karimabad-e Seyyed Ali Khamenehi, a village in Khash County

South Khorasan Province
Heydarabad, Birjand, a village in Birjand County
Heydarabad, Nehbandan, a village in Nehbandan County

Tehran Province
Heydarabad, Tehran, a village in Pakdasht County

West Azerbaijan Province
Heydarabad, Khoy, a village in Khoy County
Heydarabad, Miandoab, a village in Miandoab County
Heydarabad, Salmas, a village in Salmas County
Heydarabad, Shahin Dezh, a village in Shahin Dezh County

Yazd Province
Heydarabad, Yazd, a village in Taft County

Pakistan
Hyderabad, Sindh

See also
Hyderabad (disambiguation)